Zeiraphera atra is a species of moth of the family Tortricidae. It is found in China (Shanxi), Korea and the Russian Far East.

References

Moths described in 1965
Eucosmini